Ledum was a genus in the family Ericaceae, including 8 species of evergreen shrubs native to cool temperate and subarctic regions of the Northern Hemisphere and commonly known as Labrador tea. It is now recognised as a subsection of section Rhododendron, subgenus Rhododendron, of the genus Rhododendron.

Description
Ledum species often grow together with poisonous plants such as bog-laurel and bog-rosemary, but certain species (e.g. L. groenlandicum and L. palustre) are easily distinguished by the distinctive rust coloured fuzz on the bottom of leaves.

Taxonomy

Reclassification into Rhododendron
Recent genetic evidence has shown that the species previously treated in this genus are correctly placed in the genus Rhododendron, where they are now treated as Rhododendron subsect. Ledum. Because some of the species names used in Ledum could not be used in Rhododendron (the names already having been used for other species already in this large genus), new names had to be coined for them.

Species
The species listed in genus Ledum (accepted and synonyms), with their current accepted names are:

Species References
Ledum

Rhododendron

Other

Hybrids
Natural hybrids (nothospecies) also occur.
Ledum columbianum = Rhododendron × columbianum (R. groenlandicum × R. neoglandulosum) is listed by Harri Harmaja as a natural hybrid.
Rhododendron vanhoeffeni Abromeit is a probably hybrid between Ledum palustre subsp. decumbens and Rhododendron lapponicum.

Uses

Some species (e.g. L. groenlandicum) have been used to produce Labrador tea. Other species have varying levels of toxicity (e.g. L. glandulosum). Evergreen Labrador Tea grows slowly, but retains its leaves year-round.  Users should take care not to over-harvest leaves from any single plant.

See also
List of Sections in Subgenus Rhododendron

Notes

References

Bibliography
 
 
 
 
 
 
 

Ledum
Flora of Alaska
Herbs
Herbal tea
Plant subsections